Gimnasio Ciudad de La Asunción is an indoor sporting arena located in La Asunción, Venezuela. The capacity of the arena is 8,500 spectators and is used mostly for basketball. It hosts the Guaiqueríes de Margarita of the Venezuelan Basketball League.

References

External links
Facility information

Indoor arenas in Venezuela
Buildings and structures in Nueva Esparta
Buildings and structures in La Asunción